The U.S. Cellular Portland Sea Dogs Radio Network is a 4-station (2 A.M., 2 F.M.) radio network in the U.S. New England states of Maine and New England.  The flagship is 95.5/95.9 WPEI/WPPI.  The play-by-play announcer is Emma Tiedemann.  The radio network broadcasts all 140 Portland Sea Dogs baseball games.

Network stations

Flagship stations (2 stations)

95.5/WPPI: Topsham, Maine
95.9/WPEI: Saco, Maine

Affiliate stations (2 stations)

Maine (2 stations)
780/WEZR: Rumford
1450/WPNO: South Paris

Former network stations (9 stations)

Former flagships (1 station)
1490/WBAE: Portland, Maine

Former affiliates (8 stations)
1160/WSKW: Skowhegan, Maine (2008)
1240/WEZR: Lewiston
1220/WPHX: Sanford, Maine (2005)
1380/WMYF: Portsmouth, New Hampshire (2012)
92.7/WOXO-FM: Norway, Maine (2005, 2012)
93.7/WRMO: Millbridge, Maine (2009-2010)
100.7/WTBM: Mexico, Maine (2005)
106.5/WMEX: Rochester, New Hampshire (2005)

References

External links
2013 Sea Dogs Radio Network page.  Retrieved January 20, 2014.
2012 Affiliate list on the Sea Dogs' website.  Retrieved January 20, 2014.
January 7, 2005 press release about the change in flagship to WBAE.

Portland Sea Dogs
Sports radio networks in the United States